Historia medicinal de las cosas que se traen de nuestras Indias Occidentales ("Medical study of the products imported from our West Indian possessions") is the standard title for a survey by Nicolás Monardes (1493–1588), Spanish physician and botanist. It appeared in successive editions under varying titles, gradually enlarged, in 1565, 1569 and 1574, followed by an unchanged reprint in 1580.

Publication details 

The full titles and publication details are:

 1565: Dos libros ...
 1569: . Sevilla: Hernando Diaz
 1574: . Sevilla: Alonso Escrivano
 1580: Reprint of the 1574 publication. Sevilla: Fernando Diaz

English translation 

An English translation, by John Frampton, appeared under the title Joyful News out of the New Found World. Publication details:

 1577: , translated from the 1565 Spanish edition. London
 1580: a new edition enlarged on the basis of the 1574 Spanish edition. London
 1925:  (cover title: Frampton's Monardes), edited by Stephen Gaselee, combining material from the 1577 and 1580 editions. London

Latin translation 

A Latin translation, abridged, with editorial commentary, was made by Charles de l'Écluse (Carolus Clusius). Publication details:

 1574: . Antwerp: Plantin
 1579: : revised with further commentary. Antwerp: Plantin
 1582: Revised and included in a compendium of translations from Garcia de Orta, Nicolás Monardes and Cristóbal Acosta
 1593: Further revised edition of this compendium
 1605: Last revision, with further commentary and illustrations, included in: Carolus Clusius, Exoticorum libri decem

References 

, pp. 14, 15, 154, 160

External links
Ioyfull newes out of the newfound world (Londres: 1580) digitized by the John Carter Brown Library
 Ioyfull newes out of the new-found vvorlde (Londres: 1596) digitized by the John Carter Brown Library  
Online copy of the book's Englished edition at Early English Books Online (access for institutional subscribers only)

Herbals
Spanish non-fiction literature
1565 books
1574 books